Steven J. Fliesler is an American biochemist and cell biologist, whose research has focused on how lipid metabolism (cholesterol metabolism, in particular) supports the normal structure and function of the vertebrate retina. He currently is the Meyer H. Riwchun Endowed Chair Professor of Ophthalmology and Vice-Chair/Director of Research in the Department of Ophthalmology, Jacobs School of Medicine and Biomedical Sciences, at the University at Buffalo, The State University of New York. In 2014, he became a UB Distinguished Professor, and in 2018 was promoted to the rank of SUNY Distinguished Professor. He is the author or coauthor of more than 150 publications, including peer-reviewed scientific/biomedical journal articles, books and book chapters.

In 2014, he became a Fellow of the Association for Research in Vision and Ophthalmology (ARVO), and in 2017 was elected President of ARVO.

Education

B.A. (Biochemistry, 1973), University of California, Berkeley, California, US.
Ph.D. (Biochemistry, 1980), Rice University, Houston, Texas, US.
Postdoctoral fellow (retinal biochemistry/cell biology, 1979–83), Cullen Eye Institute, Baylor College of Medicine, Houston, Texas, US.

Honors and awards

1979–82 NIH N.R.S.A. Postdoctoral Fellowship (F32 Award)
1992 James S. Adams Scholar, Research to Prevent Blindness, Inc.
1993 Scientist of the Year, Sigma Xi-  Saint Louis University Chapter
2002 Chancellor's Award in Neuroscience Lecturer, LSU School of Medicine
2007 Senior Scientific Investigator Award, Research to Prevent Blindness
2008 Meyer H. Riwchun Endowed Chair Professor, University at Buffalo/SUNY
2009 Silver Tier Fellow of the Association for Research in Vision and Ophthalmology (FARVO)
2014 Gold Tier Fellow of the Association for Research in Vision and Ophthalmology (FARVO)
2014–19 Member (elected), ARVO board of trustees (Retinal Cell Biology (RC) Section Trustee)
2014 SUNY Chancellor's Award for Excellence in Scholarship and Creative Activities
2014 UB Distinguished Professor, University at Buffalo/SUNY
2015 Dowling Society Member, ARVO Foundation
2016 Research Career Scientist Award (RCSA), Dept of Veterans Affairs
2016 Special Recognition Award, International Society for Eye Research (ISER)
2017 Dean's Award in Ophthalmology and Neuroscience, LSU School of Medicine
2018 SUNY Distinguished Professor, University at Buffalo/SUNY
2018 Roski Eye Institute Distinguished Lecturer, University of Southern California
2018 Distinguished Lecturer, Wilmer Science Seminar Series, Johns Hopkins University

Selected publications
Oxysterols and Retinal Degeneration in a Rat Model of Smith-Lemli-Opitz Syndrome: Implications for an Improved Therapeutic Intervention. Molecules. 2018; 23(10).
Long-Term Functional and Structural Consequences of Primary Blast Overpressure to the Eye. Journal of Neurotrauma. 2018; 35(17).
Lipid-derived and other oxidative modifications of retinal proteins in a rat model of Smith-Lemli-Opitz syndrome. Exp Eye Res. 2018.
Compromised phagosome maturation underlies RPE pathology in cell culture and whole animal models of Smith-Lemli-Opitz Syndrome. Autophagy. 2018; 14(10).
Robust lysosomal calcium signaling through channel TRPML1 is impaired by lysosomal lipid accumulation. The FASEB Journal. 2018; 32(2).
Prevention of Retinal Degeneration in a Rat Model of Smith-Lemli-Opitz Syndrome. Scientific Reports. 2018; 8(1).
Streamlined duplex live-dead microplate assay for cultured cells. Exp Eye Res. 2017; 161.
Mass spectrometry-based proteomics of oxidative stress: Identification of 4-hydroxy-2-nonenal (HNE) adducts of amino acids using lysozyme and bovine serum albumin as model proteins. Electrophoresis. 2016; 37(20).
Differential cytotoxic effects of 7-dehydrocholesterol-derived oxysterols on cultured retina-derived cells: Dependence on sterol structure, cell type, and density. Exp Eye Res. 2016; 145.
Glycosylation of rhodopsin is necessary for its stability and incorporation into photoreceptor outer segment discs. Human Molecular Genetics. 2015; 24(10).

References

External links 
 

Living people
American biochemists
State University of New York faculty
Rice University alumni
Year of birth missing (living people)